The name Ornithocephalus ('bird head') may refer either to

 Ornithocephalus (plant), a genus of orchids
 an obsolete name once applied to a pterosaur specimens now classified as Pterodactylus.